Darryl, Daryl or Darrell Johnson may refer to:

Sports
Darrell Johnson (1928–2004), American baseball player
Daryl Johnson (born 1946), American football defensive back
Darrel Johnson (born 1959), college basketball coach
Darryl Johnson (basketball) (born 1965), American basketball player
Darryl Johnson (American football) (born 1997), American football defensive end

Others
Darryl N. Johnson (1938–2018), American politician
Daryl Johnson (musician), American musician

See also
Daryl Johnston (born 1966), American football executive and former fullback